The Tjuroro, also known as the Jurruru, were an Aboriginal Australian people of Western Australia.

Name
The Tjuroro ethnonym appears to have meant 'lowlanders', in opposition to the Kurama (uplanders).

Language
The Tjuroro spoke Jurruru.

Country
 along and southeast of the Ashburton River from Kooline to Ashburton Downs and Turee Creek junction. Their northern extension went as far as the slopes overlooking the Pilbara's Hardey River. They also hunted as far north and south as the headwaters of the creeks in the Kenneth and Capricorn Ranges.

Alternative names
 Churoro, Choororo, Chooraroo
 Djururo
 Tjororo, Tjururu, Tjururo

Source:

Notes

Citations

Sources

Aboriginal peoples of Western Australia